Francisco José Álvarez (5 May 1908 – died before 1987) was a Mexican gymnast. He competed in three events at the 1932 Summer Olympics.

References

External links
 

1908 births
Year of death missing
Mexican male artistic gymnasts
Olympic gymnasts of Mexico
Gymnasts at the 1932 Summer Olympics
Place of birth missing
20th-century Mexican people